William Bewley (October 21, 1878 – November 6, 1953) was an American businessman and politician from New York.

Life
He was born on October 21, 1878, in Lockport, Niagara County, New York, the son of Joseph Bewley and Mary (Howe) Bewley. He attended the public schools in Lockport, and Clark's Business School in Buffalo, New York. In 1901, he married Helen Margaret Dickson (died 1921).

Bewley was a member of the New York State Assembly (Niagara Co., 1st D.) in 1914, 1915, 1916, 1917, 1918 and 1919; and was Chairman of the Committee on Labor and Industries from 1916 to 1919.

On November 22, 1922, he married Blanche Lovina Clark. In 1925, he established with his brother a canning factory in Middleport.

He was again a member of the State Assembly in 1927 and 1928.

He was a member of the New York State Senate from 1939 to 1948, sitting in the 162nd, 163rd, 164th, 165th and 166th New York State Legislatures.

He died on November 6, 1953, in Lockport City Hospital in Lockport, New York.

Sources

1878 births
1953 deaths
Republican Party New York (state) state senators
Politicians from Lockport, New York
Republican Party members of the New York State Assembly